The following radio stations broadcast on AM frequency 1250 kHz: 1250 AM is a Regional broadcast frequency.

Argentina
 Estirpe Nacional in San Justo

Canada

Mexico
 XEDK-AM in Guadalajara, Jalisco
 XETEJ-AM in Tejupilco, Mexico
 XEZT-AM in Puebla, Puebla

United States

Uruguay
 CX 36 Radio Centenario in Montevideo

References

Lists of radio stations by frequency